Atlas Games is a company which publishes role-playing games, board games and card games. Its founder and current president is John Nephew.

History
When Atlas Games did not have the finances to publish On the Edge (1994), they partnered with Jerry Corrick and Bob Brynildson and formed a new corporation called Trident, Inc. to publish the game. Eventually Atlas subsumed into Trident; Brynildson, Corrick, and their store - The Source Comics & Games - continued to support Atlas with their business experience and perspective.

The company published the periodical EdgeWork for four issues.

Games published

Role-playing games
 Ars Magica (The 5th edition won the 2004 Origins Award for Best Role-Playing Game.)
 Feng Shui (The 2nd edition won the Gold ENnie Awards in 2016 for Best Rules and Best Setting.)
 Furry Pirates (Swashbuckling Adventure in the Furry Age of Piracy)
 Magical Kitties Save the Day
 Northern Crown
 Over the Edge 
 Pandemonium (Adventures in Tabloid World)
 Unknown Armies

Licensed settings and adventures
 Nyambe - D20 system campaign setting
 Fantasy Bestiary and adventures for D20
 Official adventures for Cyberpunk 2020

Board games
 Cults Across America
 Dungeoneer
 Recess!

Card games
 Beer Money
 Cthulhu 500 (2004 Origins Award for Best Traditional Card Game) 
 Gloom (2005 Origins Award for Traditional Card Game of the Year)
 Lunch Money (Tied for 1996 Origins Award for Best Card Game) 
 Lunch Money: Sticks and Stones
 On the Edge Collectible Card Game
 Once Upon a Time 
 Once Upon a Time: Dark Tales* Spammers

Other games
 Pieces of Eight (Winner of an Origins Vanguard Award)
 Seismic (by Ted Alspach)

References

External links

 
Board game publishing companies
Role-playing game publishing companies
Companies based in Saint Paul, Minnesota